Toreulia imminuta is a species of moth of the family Tortricidae. It is found in Ecuador in the provinces of Napo and Morona-Santiago.

The wingspan is 15–19 mm.  The ground colour of the forewings is whitish creamy, suffused and strigulated (fine streaks) with rusty brown. The hindwings are creamy with brownish suffusions.

Etymology
The species name refers to the strongly reduced end part of the sacculus and is derived from Latin imminuta (meaning diminished).

References

Moths described in 2007
Euliini